Rendu Rellu Aaru was an Indian Telugu romantic comedy soap opera directed by Vasu Inturi aired on Gemini TV from 12 November 2018 to 13 November 2020 every Monday to Saturday for 491 episodes. The serial starred Sadhana, Renuka Jaya Harika, Priyanka, Madhubabu, Krishna Reddy as main protagonists and Rajashri Nair, Vasu Inturi, Ragini, Ramjagan in pivotal roles.

Plot
Rendu Rellu Aaru is an amusing story about two young married women, Chitra and Krishna who decide to swap bodies for a brief time, in order to resolve their problems.

Cast

Main cast
Renuka as Chitra
Sadhana /Priyanka as Krishnaveni (krishna), Chitra's best friend and journalist and Nandu
Madhu babu as Arjun
Krishna Reddy as Radhakrishna
Jaya Harika as Gopika, Obul Reddy's raised daughter and Agricultural scientist
Rajashri Nair as Bhanumathi (Arjun and Madhumathi's mother) 
----- as Murali

supporting cast
Vasu Inturi as Obul Reddy (Gopika's foster father and Scientist)
Ramjagan as Siddharth Varma (Siddhu), Radha's father
Ragini as Madhu/Radha's mother
Bhargavi as Jayanthi (Nandu's mother)
Prudhvi as Yamadharma Raju
Tagubothu Ramesh 
Gopal Krishna Akella as Chitragupta
Shashank as Sankarabharanam, cook in siddhu's house
Krishna Sri as Subhadra/Krishna's mother
Sumana Sri as Janaki/Chitra's mother
Sandeepthi as Madhumathi, Arjun's sister
Surya Teja as Chandra Rao, Indumathi husband
Prathyusha as Indumathi, Bhanumathi's sister
Ajay as Muralidhar Rao aka Murali Mohan, Bhanumathi's husband 
Sriragh as Sriragh, Chitra's teacher
Visweswar Rao as priest

Former cast

Bhanusri as Krishna (replaced by Sadhana)
Anchor Chandu as Radha Krishna (replaced by Krishna Reddy)
Shyam Kumar as Arjun (replaced by Madhu babu)
Priyaawasty as Indumathi (replaced by Pratyusha)

Airing history
The serial started airing on Gemini TV on 12 November 2018. It aired on Monday to Friday. The serial ended on 13 November 2020 after airing 491 episodes.

References

Indian television soap operas
Telugu-language television shows
2018 Indian television series debuts
Gemini TV original programming